Sir John Hay Drummond Hay   (1 June 1816 – 27 November 1893) was the United Kingdom's Envoy Extraordinary at the Court of Morocco in the 19th century.

Early life 
John Drummond Hay was born in 1816 in Valenciennes, France, where his father Captain Edward Drummond Hay, a nephew of the ninth Earl of Kinnoul, was serving in the British army of occupation.

Like his elder brother, Edward Hay Drummond Hay, he was educated at the Edinburgh Academy, and then at Charterhouse School.

At the age of 24, he was appointed a paid attaché to the Embassy of Constantinople, where he remained for four years, and was then sent to Morocco to assist his father the Agent and Consul-General in his communications with the Court of Morocco during the difficulties with the French Government.  In this mission he displayed so much ability that a few months afterwards, though still having merely the rank of a paid attaché, he succeeded his temporary chief as Agent and Consul-General.

Diplomat 
Thus began diplomatic activity, involving considerable personal initiative and freedom of action, which lasted without interruption for more than 40 years. During this long period his intelligence, energy, and thorough knowledge of the Oriental character enabled him to exercise an amount of influence, both with the Government and with the native of all classes with whom he came in contact, such as had never been enjoyed by any of his predecessors, and such as none of his successors is ever likely to obtain.  He belonged, in fact, to a category of diplomatists who are very useful in semi-civilized countries, but who are no longer to be found so near to Europe, and who are not well adapted to the present methods of bureaucratic and Parliamentary control.

In 1845, he acted as a mediator in the difficulties which Morocco had with Denmark, Sweden, and Spain. In that capacity, he signed the convention which the Sultan concluded with the Court of Madrid. In 1856 he negotiated and signed the Anglo-Moroccan Accords, a general treaty and a commercial convention with the Moroccan government. He was raised five years afterwards to the rank of Minister Resident.

In 1861 he was appointed by Emperor Pedro II of Brazil a Knight Grand Cross of the Order of the Rose. His further promotion to the rank of Minister Plenipotentiary took place in 1872, and to that of Envoy Extraordinary in 1880.

He was appointed a Knight Grand Cross of the Order of Saint Michael and Saint George (GCMG) in 1884.

In July 1886, he retired on a pension, and was sworn a Privy Councillor, but he continued to reside privately a great part of the year in the country where he had served his country, so long and so successfully.  He died at Wedderburn Castle, near Duns, in Scotland.

Writings 

 Hay, Sir John H. Drummond. 1844. Western Barbary: Its Wild Tribes and Savage Animals. London: John Murray.
 Hay, Sir John H. Drummond. 1888. "Reminiscences of Boar-hunting in Morocco." Murray’s Magazine: A Home and colonial periodical for the general reader, 330-342.
 Brooks, LAE. 1896. A Memoir of Sir John Hay Drummond Hay: Sometime Minister at the Court of Morocco based on His Journals and Correspondence. London: John Murray

References

Further reading
Ben-Srhir, Khalid. (2005). Britain and Morocco During the Embassy of John Drummond Hay, 1845–1886. Taylor & Francis.
Rigg, J. M. (2004). "Hay, Sir John Hay Drummond- (1816–1893)". Lynn Milne, ed. Oxford Dictionary of National Biography.

1816 births
1893 deaths
People educated at Charterhouse School
Knights Grand Cross of the Order of St Michael and St George
Knights Commander of the Order of the Bath
Ambassadors of the United Kingdom to Morocco
Members of the Privy Council of the United Kingdom